Subha Venkatesan (born 31 August 1999) is an Indian athlete. She competed in the women's 4 × 400 metres relay event at the 2019 World Athletics Championships. In July 2021, she was selected for representing India at the 2020 Summer Olympics in the mixed 4 × 400 metres relay.

References

External links
 

1999 births
Living people
Indian female sprinters
Place of birth missing (living people)
World Athletics Championships athletes for India
Athletes (track and field) at the 2020 Summer Olympics
Olympic athletes of India